William J. Lavery (born March 26, 1938 in Bridgeport, Connecticut) is the Chief Court Administrator and former Chief Judge of the Connecticut Appellate Court.  Lavery   was appointed judge of the Connecticut Appellate Court on October 4, 1989; Chief Judge on March 12, 2000; and Chief Court Administrator on February 1, 2006.

Education
Lavery graduated from Fairfield Prep in 1955; received his bachelor's degree from Fairfield University in 1959; and received his law degree from Fordham Law School.

Career
While in private practice, Lavery was elected to the Bridgeport Board of Aldermen (1963–1967) and the Connecticut House of Representatives (1967–1971). Throughout the 1970s, he served as counsel for the Bridgeport Housing Authority, the Majority Party in the Connecticut House of Representatives, and the Town of Newtown, Connecticut. He was vice-chairman of the Connecticut Commission on Hospitals and Healthcare and a member of the State's Council on Environmental Quality.

In 1981, Lavery was appointed a Connecticut Superior Court judge and served as presiding judge in the Danbury Judicial District and chief administrative judge in Waterbury Judicial District prior to his appointment to the Connecticut Appellate Court.

External links
Official biography from the State of Connecticut Judicial Branch Site
Fairfield University Alumni Professional Achievement Award Profile

References

1938 births
Living people
Lawyers from Bridgeport, Connecticut
Connecticut city council members
Fairfield University alumni
Fordham University School of Law alumni
Judges of the Connecticut Appellate Court
Members of the Connecticut House of Representatives
Fairfield College Preparatory School alumni